This is a listing of Australian rules footballers who made their senior debut for an Australian Football League (AFL) club in 2001.

Debuts

References

Australian rules football records and statistics
Australian rules football-related lists
2001 in Australian rules football